The Philadelphia Naval Hospital was the first high-rise hospital building constructed by the United States Navy. The dedicated medical purpose of this facility contributed to the World War II mission as the center for amputation, orthopedic and prosthetic services for Navy, Marine, and Coast Guard veterans residing east of the Rocky Mountains.

The complex was developed as a tree-lined campus of 56 buildings and structures with the main high-rise building placed at the center and augmented with amenities of a Navy Base Exchange (BX) and gas station. The central building was flanked by lower buildings in a classical Beaux-Arts arrangement. It was a striking 15-story Art Deco steel-framed tower, faced with yellow brick and brown terra cotta and described in a survey of Philadelphia architecture as "one of the finest Art Deco buildings in the city." The height was a significant departure from the two- or three-story naval hospital complexes that preceded it. Detailing the building's interior included such significant features as anodized aluminum heater grates depicting a ship in full sail. The grates were set in marble panels in the vestibule and below were air intakes in the shape of dolphins.

By the late 1970s declining use of the facility and studies that determined the building incapable of being renovated for modern medical use signaled the end of the hospital's role as major medical facility for the Navy. In 1988, under the Base Realignment and Closure Act of 1988 (BRAC), the Philadelphia Naval Hospital was slated for closure and disposal. All functions were relocated from the complex in 1993, and since that date the buildings were vacant and overseen by a small security and maintenance staff. The city of Philadelphia was approved to purchase it for re-use. It was finally demolished on 9 June 2001 at 7:02 A.M.

Location
The property was oriented along the east–west axis with a rectangular border. The property was bounded on the north by Hartranft Street; on the east by Broad Street; on the South by Pattison Avenue; and on the west by 20th Street. There were residential neighborhoods of Packer Park north of the Naval Hospital property; a South Philadelphia Sports Complex east and southeast of the hospital campus; Franklin Delano Roosevelt Park south and southwest; and on the west side former Navy family residences known as Capehart Housing. Capehart was also vacated and became Navy surplus until purchased in 2003 by John Westrum and redeveloped on the same site plan and foundations to construct new market rate town home housing named the "Reserve at Packer Park."

Remaining buildings

Three two-story naval residential buildings facing along Pattison Avenue surrounded with landscaped gardens have been incorporated into the new use of the site as office buildings. These 1930s Naval Hospital buildings were consistent with the Art Deco architectural design in an institutional setting. The original use:

Building A: Constructed to serve as living quarters for the Naval Hospital's commandant.
Building B/C: Constructed as twin or duplex dwelling to serve as living quarters for the Naval Hospital's chief medical and surgical officers.
Building D: Constructed to serve as the residence of the executive officer.

See also

Philadelphia Naval Shipyard
Philadelphia Naval Asylum
William P. C. Barton Naval Surgeon of Philadelphia

References

Preservation PA

External links
 Library of Congress Photographic Archives
 Photographic and site descriptive text
 EPA Surplus Naval property Plan
 Demolition
 Google Map Street View front gate entrance on Pattison Avenue with remaining buildings A, B, C, & D

History of Philadelphia
Hospital buildings completed in 1935
Government buildings completed in 1935
Buildings and structures demolished in 2001
Hospitals in Philadelphia
Military hospitals in the United States
Medical installations of the United States Navy
Art Deco architecture in Pennsylvania
South Philadelphia
Skyscrapers in Philadelphia
1935 establishments in Pennsylvania
2001 disestablishments in Pennsylvania